Biridiya was the ruler of Megiddo in the 14th century BC. Biridiya authored five of the Amarna letters correspondence. 

The name 'Biridiya' is also mentioned in the corpus from the city of 'Kumidu' (letter KL 72:600), the Kamid al lawz. However, the origin of the letter has not been identified, and the content of the letter (request for return of personal property) makes it unlikely it was sent by the King of Megiddo.

See also
Hannathon, Biridiya letter EA 245, title: "Assignment of Guilt"

References

Moran, William L. The Amarna Letters. Johns Hopkins University Press, 1987, 1992. (softcover)

Canaanite people
Amarna letters writers
14th-century BC people